Dennis Young may refer to:
Dennis Young (Australian politician) (born 1947), Australian politician and anti-drug campaigner
Dennis Young (Canadian politician)
Dennis Young (diver), English diver
Dennis Young (Papua New Guinean politician) (1936–2008), acting Governor-General of Papua New Guinea in 1991
Dennis Young (rugby union) (1930–2020), New Zealand rugby union player

See also
Dennis DeYoung (born 1947), American singer-songwriter